Sophronia illustrella is a moth of the family Gelechiidae. It was described by Jacob Hübner in 1796. It is found in Italy, Austria, the Czech Republic, Slovakia, Bosnia and Herzegovina, Albania, Hungary, Romania, the Caucasus and Asia Minor.

References

Moths described in 1796
Sophronia (moth)